Badminton, for the 2013 Island Games, was held at the Jessie Vesey Sports Center. It is located at the Bermuda High School for Girls in Pembroke Parish, Bermuda. With a practice day on July 13, the events took place from 14 to 19 July 2013.

Medal table
Final medal tally, based on the 2013 IG Badminton Medal Table page:

Medal summary

References

Island Games
2013 Island Games
Badminton in Bermuda
2013